The Blood of Others is a 1984 drama film directed by Claude Chabrol. It is based on the 1945 novel The Blood of Others by Simone de Beauvoir. The film was originally made as a three-hour English-language television film which debuted on August 25, 1984 on HBO. The film was then edited down by 40 minutes and dubbed into French for a European theatrical release.

Plot
In Nazi occupied France, Jean Blomart sits by a bed in which his lover Hélène lies dying. Through a series of flashbacks, we learn about both characters and their relationship to each other. As a young man filled with guilt about his privileged middle-class life, Jean joins the Communist Party and breaks from his family, determined to make his own way in life. After the death of a friend in a political protest, for which he feels guilty, Jean quits the Party and concentrates on trade union activities. Hélène is a young designer who works in her family's confectionery shop and is dissatisfied with her conventional romance with her fiance Paul. She contrives to meet Jean, and although he initially rejects her, they form a relationship after she has an abortion following a reckless liaison with another man. Jean tells Hélène he loves her even though he believes he does not. He proposes to her and she accepts.

When France enters World War II, Jean, conceding the need for violent conflict to effect change, becomes a soldier. Hélène intervenes against his will to arrange a safe posting for him. Angry with her, Jean breaks their relationship. As the German forces advance towards Paris, Hélène flees and witnesses the suffering of other refugees. Returning to Paris, she briefly takes up with a German who could advance her career, but soon sees what her countrymen are suffering. She also witnesses the roundup of Jews. Securing the safety of her Jewish friend Yvonne leads Hélène back to Jean, who has become a leader in a Resistance group. She is moved to join the group. Jean has reconnected with his father with the common goal to liberate France from Germany. His mother, however, is less impressed by the lives lost to the Resistance.

Hélène is shot in a resistance activity and during Jean's night vigil at her side, he examines his love for Hélène and the wider consequences of his actions. As morning dawns, Hélène dies and Jean decides to continue with acts of resistance.

Cast
 Jodie Foster as Hélène Bertrand
 Michael Ontkean as Jean Blomart
 Sam Neill as Dieter Bergman
 Lambert Wilson as Paul
 Stéphane Audran as Gigi
 Alexandra Stewart as Madeleine
 Jean-François Balmer as Arnaud
 John Vernon as Charles
 Michel Robin as Raoul
 Jean-Pierre Aumont as M. Blomart
 Jean-Yves Berteloot as Coutant Repentigny

Soundtrack
 "C'était écrit"
 Composed by Jacques Stern
 Lyrics by Jack Meskill
 Performed by Maurice Chevalier
 "Ménilmontant"
 Written and performed by Charles Trenet
 "À Paris dans chaque Faubourg"
 Composed by Maurice Jaubert
 Lyrics by René Clair
 Performed by Lys Gauty

Reception
From Dennis Schwartz of Ozus' World Movie Reviews, who gave the film a C−:

References

External links 

1984 films
1980s American television miniseries
Holocaust films
World War II television drama series
1980s English-language films
English-language Canadian films
English-language French films
Films directed by Claude Chabrol
Films about the French Resistance
Films set in the 1930s
Films set in the 1940s
Films set in Paris
Films shot in Belgium
Films shot in France
Films shot in Paris
HBO original programming
1980s German-language films
Television shows based on French novels
Films based on French novels
Works by Brian Moore (novelist)
French World War II films
Canadian war drama films
French war drama films
1980s Canadian films
1980s French films
American World War II films
Canadian World War II films
American war drama films